The plumbeous seedeater (Sporophila plumbea) is a species of bird in the family Thraupidae.
It is found in Argentina, Bolivia, Brazil, Colombia, French Guiana, Guyana, Paraguay, Peru, Suriname, and Venezuela.
Its natural habitats are dry savanna and subtropical or tropical seasonally wet or flooded lowland grassland.

References

plumbeous seedeater
Birds of Colombia
Birds of Venezuela
Birds of the Guianas
Birds of Bolivia
Birds of Brazil
plumbeous seedeater
Birds of the Amazon Basin
Taxonomy articles created by Polbot